U Don't Know Me (Like U Used To) – The Remix EP is a remix EP by American recording artist Brandy Norwood. It was released on October 5, 1999 on Atlantic Records in conjunction with the release of the same-titled song from her second studio album Never Say Never (1998), the sixth single to be lifted from it. Several producers contributed to the production of the EP, including Albert Cabrera, Pull, Rodney "Darkchild" Jerkins, DJ Premier, and Guy Roche.

Release
During 1999, her record company, Atlantic Records, issued a 9-track remix EP entitled U Don't Know Me (Like U Used To) – The Remix EP. The album features remix versions with Da Brat, Fat Joe, Big Pun, Darkchild, DJ Premier and various other artists and producers. The album is often considered a maxi single so the peak positions are the same as the peak positions of the single. The up-tempo tracks on U Don't Know Me saw minor success with a peak position of number 79 on the U.S. Hot 100, and number 50 in Canada. The album's lead single was a remix of the title track, "U Don't Know Me (Like U Used To)".

Track listing

Credits and personnel

Brandy – vocals, producer, executive producer
Albert Cabrera – overdubs, editing
Da Brat – performer
Paris Davis – executive producer
DJ Premier – remixing

Fat Joe – performer
Rodney Jerkins – producer, executive producer, remixing
Craig Kallman – executive producer
Pull – remixing
Shaunta – performer

References

1999 EPs
Brandy Norwood albums
1999 remix albums
Remix EPs
Albums produced by DJ Premier
Atlantic Records remix albums
Atlantic Records EPs